North Bengal (/উত্তর বাংলা) is a term used for the north-western part of Bangladesh and northern part of West Bengal. The Bangladesh part denotes the Rajshahi Division and Rangpur Division. Generally, it is the area lying west of Jamuna River and north of Padma River and includes the Barind Tract. The West Bengal part denotes Jalpaiguri Division (Alipurduar, Cooch Behar, Darjeeling, Jalpaiguri, and Kalimpong) and the Malda division (Uttar Dinajpur, Dakshin Dinajpur, and Malda) together. The Bihar parts include the Kishanganj district. It also includes parts of Darjeeling Hills. Traditionally, the Ganga River divides  Bengal into South Bengal and North Bengal, divided again into Terai and Dooars regions.
Jalpesh and jatileswar are some of the most popular sacred places.
Regions of Bangladesh

In Bangladesh

Religion

The population of the region is 30,201,873 (3 crore) as per the 2011 census.

In sports 
The North Zone cricket team in Bangladesh is a first-class cricket team that represents northern Bangladesh (Rajshahi and Rangpur) in the Bangladesh Cricket League.

In West Bengal (India)

Religion

The population of the region is 17,211,010 (1.7 crore) as per the 2011 census.

Cities and towns (North Bengal)

Bangladesh 
Rajshahi, is the divisional capital of Rajshahi Division. The city has an excellent railway transport system. 
Sirajganj, is an important city situated on the bank of Jamuna River. Sirajganj District is known as the gateway to North Bengal.
Pabna, is an important city situated on the bank of Padma River. Jagannath Temple is one of the most beautiful Hindu Temple in northern Bengal in this city.
Ishwardi, is a city in Pabna District. It is also the headquarters of the western zone of Bangladesh Railway.
Rangpur, is a city located in the Rangpur District. It is the headquarters of Rangpur Division. It is one of the modern cities in this division.
Bogra, is a major city located in the Bogra district, Rajshahi Division, Bangladesh. It is a major commercial hub. It is also known as the capital of North Bengal in Bangladesh. Bogra is considered the oldest city of Bengal, dating to the reign of the Great Emperor Ashoka, who ruled India from 268 to 232 BCE. 
Joypurhat Sadar, is the capital of Joypurhat District. Joypurhat Sugar Mill's Limited is the largest autonomous sugar mill in Bangladesh which is in this city. Pagla Dewan Boddhovumi is one of Bangladesh's most important monuments.
 Natore, is the North Bengal capital and headquarter of Natore District . Uttara Ganabhaban is located near Natore town in North Bengal. On 24 July 1967, it was designated as a gubernatorial residence by Abdul Monem Khan the governor of East Pakistan. After the independence of Bangladesh prime minister Sheikh Mujibur Rahman declared the place as his official residence in Northern Bangladesh on 9 February 1972.                           
 Tentulia 
 Panchagarh, is the northernmost city of Bangladesh. It has beautiful tea gardens.

West Bengal 
 Alipurduar , is the main commercial town of the Eastern Dooars region. Now Alipurduar is a new district.
 Buniadpur, is a newly planned municipal city, a census town & a sub-divisionisnal's headquarter in Dakshin Dinajpur district in North Bengal in the state of West Bengal, India.
 Madarihat 
 Banarhat 
 Cooch Behar, was once home to the famous Cooch Behar kingdom. The North Bengal State Transport Corporation operates its services from all over the region. It has its headquarters here. It also features the North Bengal State Library.
 Dalkhola, is a commercial town, business hub, and 4th largest railway station in North Bengal.
 Darjeeling, is the largest hill town in the region.  It was once the summer capital of Bengal.
 Dhupguri, is one of the most flourishing cities of the region, due to its significant location.
 Dinhata 
 Falakata 
 Teesta Bazaar 
 Farakka 
 Gangarampur 
 Haldibari 
 Gorubathan 
 Bagdogra 
 Hasimara 
 Algarah 
 Pedong  
 Matigara 
 Labha 
 Rambi Bazar 
 Phulbari 
 Maharaja Hat 
 Mirik 
 Jaldhaka 
 Itahar 
 Islampur 
 Mekliganj 
 Jalpaiguri, Once the most important town and the home to the tea industry and the headquarters of the Jalpaiguri division of West Bengal. The city is home to the Circuit Bench of the Kolkata High Court and features the newly built-up Jalpaiguri Medical College.
 Kalimpong, is a hill station of the region. It is the 21st district of West Bengal.
 Kurseong, is another hill station of the region.
 Kaliaganj, is a census town in Uttar Dinajpur district, North Bengal in the state of West Bengal, India.
 Malbazar, is one of the most important towns of North Bengal and is known for its scenic beauty and tea gardens around.
 Maynaguri, is also one of the most important towns in North Bengal, which is situated at the junction of several cities and connects Jalpaiguri, Malbazar, Dhupguri, Mathabhanga, Changrabandha, etc. with one other. It is also one of the most important business locations and is known as the 'Gateway to the Dooars'.
Balurghat, is the headquarters of Dakshin Dinajpur district of West Bengal.
Malda, English Bazar or mainly known as Malda is the second-largest city in the region and the most important commercial city. It is the headquarters of Malda division. The University of Gour Banga and Malda Medical College and Hospital are situated in this town. Malda Town railway station which is the second busiest station in this region, after New Jalpaiguri.
 Naxalbari, is a small hamlet in the Darjeeling district. It is the place from where the Naxalite movement draws its name and was the scene of the first Naxal agitation.
 Raiganj, is the district headquarters of Uttar Dinajpur.
 Siliguri, is the largest city of North Bengal and its commercial and transport hub. University of North Bengal is situated at Raja Rammohanpur and North Bengal Medical College and Hospital are situated at Sushrutanagar in this town.
 Totopara, is a small village in Alipurduar district, and home to one of the last remaining ethnic tribes of the regions – the Totos.
Tufanganj, is a city and municipality of Cooch Behar district and one of the most commercial cities in this region. A mental hospital is situated in this town and it is also known as the "Gateway of Assam".

See also
 Mithila (proposed Indian state)
 South Bengal

References

 Sujit Ghosh, Colonial Economy in North Bengal: 1833–1933, Kolkata: Paschimbanga Anchalik Itihas O Loksanskriti Charcha Kendra, 2016, .

External links 
 Tourist Attractions in North Bengal and Siliguri
 Visit this page for more information about various places of North Bengal 
 North Bengal Tourism - Official Website

North Bengal
Geography of Bangladesh
Geography of West Bengal